The 2017 General Aung San Shield Final is the 7th final of the MFF Cup.
The General Aung San Shield winner will qualify to AFC Cup competition. 
The match was contested by Shan United and Yangon United  at Bogyoke Aung San Stadium in Yangon. The match will play  on 25 October 2017 and was the final match of the Bogyoke Aung San Cup.

Background
It is Shan United's first time ever General Aung San Shield final.

Yangon United were playing a record 3rd MFF Cup final. They had previously lose against Magwe in 2017 General Aung San Shield final.

Ticket allocation
Both Shan United and Yangon United received a ticket allocation of 10,000 for the game. Ticket price are 1,000 MMK(Normal Ticket) and 2,000MMK(Special Ticket).

Route to the Final

Shan United

Shan United, as a National League team, started their campaign in the second round. In it, they won at MNL-2 City Stars. At Thuwunna, Shan United won 6-0 with goals from Han Kyung-In's Hat-rick, two goal from Christopher Chizoba and Dway Ko Ko Chit. In the Quarter-final, Shan United drew Myanmar National League Magwe. At Thuwunna Stadium, Shan United won 3-2 with Christopher Chizoba, Maximum and Dway Ko Ko Chit. In the Semi-final, Shan United were drawn against Ayeyawady United. At Taunggyi Stadium, Shan United draw 1–1 with goals from Dway Ko Ko Chit. And Semi-final Second leg at Ayar Stadium, They drew 2-2 and go to final with Away Goal. Shan United reached for the first time to 2017 General Aung San Shield Final.

Yangon United

Yangon United also started in the second round where they were drawn against MNL-2 side Myawady FC. At Thuwunna Stadium, Yangon United won 3-0 with two goals from Kyaw Ko Ko and another goal form Pyae Phyo Zaw . In the Quarter-final, they were drawn with MNL team Hantharwady United at Aung San Stadium. Yangon United won 4–0 with Hat-trick goals from Kyaw Ko Ko and one goal from Cezar. In the Semi-final First Leg, Yangon United were drawn against MNL big team Yadanarbon. At home, Yangon United won 1–0 with goals from Cezar. In the Semi-finals Second Leg, they drew 1-1. And passed to go to 3rd Final.

Match

Details

Statistics

Broadcasting rights

These matches will be broadcast live on Myanmar television:

References

General Aung San Shield
2017 in Burmese football